Don and Dewey were an American rock, blues and R&B duo, comprising Don "Sugarcane" Harris (Don Francis Bowman Harris; June 18, 1938 – December 1, 1999) and Dewey Terry (Dewey Steven Terry; July 17, 1937 – May 11, 2003).

History
Both Harris and Terry were born in Los Angeles and grew up in Pasadena, California. As children, Terry learned piano and sang in a choir, while Harris learned classical violin. The group performed together and made several recordings in the mid-1950s for small local record labels, including Dig This Record.

The group split up in 1956, but Harris and Terry continued to perform together, and made their first recordings as a duo for the Shade label.  By this time, Harris played electric violin, and Terry played piano and bass.  They were signed by Art Rupe's Specialty Records label and for the next two years produced rock and roll. Both Don and Dewey played guitar, with Dewey often doubling on keyboards. When not playing guitar or bass, Don occasionally played the electric violin, a skill for which he subsequently became well known under the name of "Sugarcane" Harris.  Drummer Earl Palmer played frequently on their sessions.

Although Don and Dewey did not have any hits of their own, several of the songs that they wrote and/or recorded would appear on the charts later, performed by other artists. "I'm Leaving It Up to You" became a #1 hit for Dale & Grace in 1963. "Farmer John" was a hit by The Premiers, reaching #19 in 1964 after having been covered by The Searchers a year earlier. "Koko Joe" (written by the then Specialty Records producer Sonny Bono), "Justine" and "Big Boy Pete" were staples for The Righteous Brothers for many years. "Big Boy Pete" became a minor hit in 1960 for The Olympics, reaching #50 and a #4 hit for The Kingsmen when recorded with new lyrics as "The Jolly Green Giant" in 1965.

In 1959 Don and Dewey and producer Bono left Specialty Records for Rush Records, where they recorded a few songs but split up shortly afterward.

In 1964 Art Rupe recorded both Don and Dewey and Little Richard (another Specialty Records act) but there were to be no further hits for either act. The pair played briefly in Little Richard's band and then went their separate ways once again.  However, they began performing together again occasionally in the mid-1970s, and continued to do so until Harris's death.

Separate careers
In the late 1960s, Harris featured on recordings with Johnny Otis of The Johnny Otis Show, and John Mayall's Bluesbreakers.  In 1970, as Sugar Cane Harris, he re-emerged to a wider rock audience, playing violin on the Hot Rats solo album by Frank Zappa, with Captain Beefheart (vocals) on "Willie The Pimp" and on the lengthy instrumental jam, "The Gumbo Variations". and in later years, went on to play on several more solo Zappa, and The Mothers of Invention albums.  He died in 1999.

Terry continued to perform and record with blues musicians until his death in 2003.

Tribute

"Don and Dewey" is also an instrumental by the band It's a Beautiful Day. It features on track 1 of their 1970 album Marrying Maiden. The band featured a violin, so this may have been the inspiration to write this piece.  This tune by IABD pays homage to Don & Dewey as the main riff borrows directly from the tune Stretchin' Out, the B side on the single credited to 'Don & Dewy', Soul Motion (Rush R-1002).  Also this riff was used by Deep Purple in their instrumental Wring That Neck (Hard Road in the U.S.).

Notes

External links
Marv Goldberg's article on Don & Dewey
Don & Dewey @ rockabilly.nl
Don & Dewey discography

American musical duos
Rock music duos
Rock and roll music groups
Specialty Records artists
Musicians from Pasadena, California